Sione Tu'amoheloa (born 20 August 1980 in Nomuka) is a Tongan rugby union prop. He is a member of the Tonga national rugby union team and participated with the squad at the 2003 and 2007 Rugby World Cups.

References

1980 births
Living people
Rugby union props
Tongan rugby union players
Tonga international rugby union players
People from Haʻapai